Rolabogan is the first and only album by Argentine pop group Rolabogan, released in 2006 (see 2006 in music). All songs were used as soundtracks for telenovela El Refugio (de los Sueños), starring group members Piru Sáez, Belén Scalella, María Fernanda Neil, Francisco Bass and Jorge Maggio. "Bailo", "No Voy a Parar", "Motivos" and "Cada Puesta al Sol" were released as singles. Rolabogan has not since released a new album.

Track listing

Personnel 
 Piru Sáez – vocals, guitar, composer
 Belén Scalella – vocals
 María Fernanda Neil – vocals
 Francisco Bass – vocals
 Jorge Maggio – vocals, back vocals

Singles

External links 
 Rolabogan at YouTube
 Rolabogan at the CD Universe
 Rolabogan at Last.fm

2006 albums